A composite field or compositum of fields is an object of study in field theory. Let L be a field, and let F, K be subfields of L.  Then the (internal) composite of F and K is defined to be the intersection of all subfields of L containing both F and K.  The composite is commonly denoted FK.  When F and K are not regarded as subfields of a common field then the (external) composite is defined using the tensor product of fields.

References
 , especially chapter 2

Field (mathematics)